Angélique Gérard, (formerly Angélique Berge) born Angélique Dilscher in 1975 in Fontainebleau, France, is a French business personality specializing in telecommunications.

She is director of subscriber relations at Internet service provider Free and a member of the executive committee of Iliad (controlling holding company). 

Manager of Memdis between 2003 and 2006, she is also CEO of Centrapel (since 2000), Total Call (since 2005), Resolution Call (since 2010), Equaline and Certicall (since 2011), Mobipel and Qualipel (since 2011) and MCRA (since 2011) 2, subsidiaries of the French telecommunications group Iliad.

A contrasting figure, the Institut Choiseul ranked it in 2013 among "The 100 economic leaders of tomorrow" in France3. Other press titles cite his ego, his alleged breaches of labor law and anti-union repression.

Biography 
Angélique Gérard obtained a university degree in technology in marketing techniques before being recruited in 1999, at the age of 23, by Xavier Niel, head of the Iliad company, which has around fifteen people.

Career 

A graduate of the European Institute of Business Administration (INSEAD) and trained as a manager at the Ecole des Hautes Études Commerciales (HEC), Angélique Gérard joined the Iliad Group at the beginning of 2000, after four years spent at France Télécom, the incumbent operator. At the origin of the creation of the Centrapel and Total Call contact centers, and having managed the integration of the resources of the operator Alice in the subscriber relationship scope after its takeover in 2008 (creation of the companies Equaline and Certicall) and the birth of the Mobipel and Qualipel companies on the occasion of the launch of Free Mobile, it supervised the growth of their workforce, set up and ensured the development of the service to subscribers as well as the deployment of teams of field technicians from 2004.

In 2012, when Xavier Niel's group began its mobile telephony activity after the takeover of the Alice group, Angélique Berge was director of customer relations for Iliad, on which Alice's former call centers depend. The newspaper Le Monde, Rue89 and union sections including the telecoms section of Union syndicale Solidaires, the General Confederation of Labor, and the General Confederation of Labor – Force Ouvrière denounce abuses reported in Colombes (the Mobipel center) and in Casablanca, including "expeditious management" and "public layoffs" 5. Angélique Berge declares in an internal publication titled "She is silent the rumor, she is silent": "Free Mobile returns strangely in the slanderous titles that we find in the press: it is indeed an indirect and disguised criticism."

In 2013 Angélique Berge, head of Free's call centers, was cited in the context of a conflict caused by "humiliations" and alleged breaches of labor law leading to a seizure of the labor inspectorate and actions by a trade union section . Angélique Berge declares in this regard: “We are proud of our working conditions. We have implemented a new incentive bonus system ”.

In May 2016 Politis carried out a survey on the "Free system", in which Angélique Berge occupies a central place. The latter is described by its employees as a "woman with an oversized ego, intelligent, but in a permanent and desperate quest for recognition" and is distinguished by an authoritarian managerial policy based, among other things, on anti-union repression, in small call centers, in competition with each other and where a "deleterious atmosphere" prevails. In 2017, it was called into question by a report by Cash Investigation, in which its management methods were criticized; In particular, an email sent to her colleague Maxime Lombardini was singled out, in which she wrote: “We will liquidate the 50 detractors”, speaking of 50 strikers

Distinctions 
In 2013, the Institut Choiseul ranked it among "The 100 economic leaders of tomorrow" in France: it entered 56th place in the ranking, then reached 14th position in 2014. In 2015, Angélique Gérard succeeded Emmanuel Macron at the head ranking.

In 2016, Angélique Gérard received the 2016 Digital Woman Prize, as part of the Women in Industry Trophies awarded by Usine Nouvelle.

In October 2017, she was decorated with the insignia of a knight of the National Order of Merit.

Professional Activities 
Gérard is a member of Gust, FundMe and the Business Angels Club of the European Institute of Business Administration (INSEAD). She supports young French entrepreneurs and is a shareholder of many youth-owned businesses such as WorldCrunch, Les Eclaireuses, StepIn, Frogans, or Pumpkin.

As Europcar prepares to launch its initial public offering (IPO), Angélique  Gérard joins the International Group's supervisory board as an independent director She is also honorary chairwoman of the Association of Free's Users (AdUF).

Bibliography

Awards and distinctions 

 The jury of the European Conference on Calling and Customer Relations Centers (SECA) honored the Centrapel, Total Call groups with the Coup de Coeur award in 2005, both the Casque de Bronze and the Coup de Coeur awards in 2006, and the Casque d’Or in 2007 for best market social practices.
 In 2007, the 60 Million Consumers magazine  in its annual benchmarking survey gave Free the highest score on the market, as 93% of its subscribers were satisfied. Another survey, published by the magazine ''Que choisir'', ranked ‘Free’ at the top of the Internet Service Providers with a consumers’ satisfaction rate of 83%. The rate exceeded 90% between 2010 and 2016.
 In 2012, three months after the launch of its mobile offers her teams won first prize in the mobile phone customer relations league tables’ (TNS Sofres).
 In March 2015, Gérard succeeded Emmanuel Macron in heading the Choiseul ranking, as one of the 100 leaders of the French economy under the age of 40.
 On 5 October 2015, Gérard received the ‘Palme de l'expérience Client’ award for  Face to Free. That same evening, she received the ‘Palme d'Or’ award for best Client Director.
 On 7 December 2015, she received the ‘2015 Leadership Hope Award.
 On 11 May 2016, her teams earned the ‘Feel Good Management Award.
 Gérard was awarded the Femme du Numérique 2016 (The 2016 Digital Woman), a prize granted by the business magazine ''Usine Nouvelle,'' .
 In October 2016, her teams were ranked second and awarded the Palme Expérience Collaborateur by the AFRC and the Relation Client magazine.
 On 14 November 2016, Angélique Gérard received the Cross of Knight of the National Order of Merit.

References

External links 
 Les Barons de la Bourse
 Editions eyrolles – Angélique Gérard
 Angelique Gerard Net Worth
 Angelique Gerard

20th-century French businesspeople
1975 births
Living people
INSEAD alumni
Knights of the Ordre national du Mérite